John Robertson (born March 30, 1993) is a former American football quarterback.

College career
He played for Villanova.

Robertson was selected as the 2012 winner of the Jerry Rice Award as the top freshman in the Football Championship Subdivision (FCS).

He finished 9th in the 2013 Walter Payton Award voting.

Robertson was selected as the 2014 winner of the Walter Payton Award. During the 2014 season, Robertson threw for 2,846 yards and 35 touchdowns. He also ran for 1,078 yards and 11 touchdowns. He suffered a concussion late in the season and chose to sit out the FCS playoff quarterfinal. Early in the 2015 season, Robertson suffered a torn PCL in his right knee.

Born and raised in Paramus, New Jersey, Robertson played high school football at Paramus High School. Robertson has a master’s degree in business administration.

Professional career
After not being selected in the 2016 NFL Draft, Robertson attended Baltimore Ravens rookie minicamp.

College statistics

References

1993 births
Living people
American football quarterbacks
People from Paramus, New Jersey
Villanova Wildcats football players
Walter Payton Award winners
Players of American football from New Jersey